The naval Battle of Dover (also known as the Battle of Goodwin Sands), fought on 19 May 1652 (29 May 1652 Gregorian calendar),  was the first engagement of the First Anglo-Dutch War between the navies of the Commonwealth of England and the United Provinces of the Netherlands.

Background 
The English Parliament had passed the first of the Navigation Acts in October 1651, aimed at hampering the shipping of the highly trade-dependent Dutch. Agitation among the Dutch merchants had been further increased by George Ayscue's capture in early 1652 of 27 Dutch ships trading with the royalist colony of Barbados in contravention of an embargo. Both sides had begun to prepare for war, but conflict might have been delayed if not for an unfortunate encounter on 29 May 1652 (19 May in the Julian calendar then in use in England) near the Straits of Dover between a Dutch convoy escorted by 40 ships under Lieutenant-Admiral Maarten Tromp and an English fleet of 25 ships under General-at-Sea Robert Blake.

Battle 
An ordinance of Cromwell required all foreign fleets in the North Sea or the Channel to dip their flag in salute, but when Tromp did not comply because he saw no reason to lower his flag for the English, Blake fired three warning shots. When the third hit his ship, wounding some sailors, Tromp replied with a warning broadside from his flagship Brederode. Blake then fired a broadside in anger and a five-hour battle ensued.

Aftermath 
Both fleets were damaged, but as darkness fell the Dutch fleet withdrew in a defensive line to protect the convoy, and the English captured two Dutch stragglers: Sint Laurens, which was taken back by them but not used, and Sint Maria, which was abandoned in a sinking condition and later made its way to the Netherlands. Tromp then offered his excuses to Blake and asked for the return of the prize, but this was refused by Blake.

War was declared by the Commonwealth on 10 July 1652.

Ships involved

England (Robert Blake)
Totals:  
Ships:  24
Cannon:  908

Anthony Young's squadron

Robert Blake's squadron in Rye Bay

Nehemiah Bourne's squadron in the Downs

The Netherlands (Maarten Tromp)
Totals:  
Ships:  44
Cannon:  1274

Convoyers

The fleet in The Downs
Van

Rear

Notes

References

 R Hainsworth, C Churches (1998) The Anglo-Dutch Wars 1652-1674, Sutton Publishing 
 NAM Roger (2004) The Command of the Ocean, Penguin Books 

Naval battles of the First Anglo-Dutch War
1652 in England
Conflicts in 1652
17th century in Kent